Salvia evansiana is a perennial plant that is native to Sichuan and Yunnan provinces in China, found growing on alpine meadows, hillsides, and forests at elevations from .

There are two varieties, with slight differences in bract and calyx size. The most notable difference is in the color of the corolla: Salvia evansiana var. evansiana has a flower that is blue-purple, with some yellow at the base. Salvia evansiana var. scaposa has a white or cream-yellow flower.

References

evansiana
Flora of China